Relations of production is a concept frequently used by Karl Marx and Friedrich Engels in their theory of historical materialism and in Das Kapital. It is first explicitly used in Marx's published book The Poverty of Philosophy, although Marx and Engels had already defined the term in The German Ideology.

Some social relations are voluntary or freely chosen (a person chooses to associate with another person or a group). But other social relations are involuntary, i.e. people can be socially related, whether they like that or not, because they are part of a family, a group, an organization, a community, a nation etc.

By "relations of production", Marx and Engels meant the sum total of social relationships that people must enter into in order to survive, to produce, and to reproduce their means of life. As people must enter into these social relationships, i.e. because participation in them is not voluntary, the totality of these relationships constitute a relatively stable and permanent structure, the "economic structure" or mode of production.

The term "relations of production" is somewhat vague, for two main reasons:
The German word Verhältnis can mean "relation", "proportion", or "ratio". Thus, the relationships could be qualitative, quantitative, or both. Which meaning applies can only be established from the context.
The relations to which Marx refers can be social relationships, economic relationships, or technological relationships.

Marx and Engels typically use the term to refer to the socioeconomic relationships characteristic of a specific epoch; for example: a capitalist's exclusive relationship to a capital good, and a wage worker's consequent relation to the capitalist; a feudal lord's relationship to a fief, and the serf's consequent relation to the lord; a slavemaster's relationship to their slave; etc. It is contrasted with and also affected by what Marx called the forces of production.

How Marx uses the concept

Here are four famous quotations showing Marx's use of the concept of relations of production:

(In other words, the English relations of production did not exist in Australia; there was no system of property rights and legal obligations and no economic necessity compelling workers to work for their boss. The servants therefore could leave Mr. Peel in order to find work or occupy free land to make a better living.)

Definitions

A social relation can be defined, in the first instance, as

a relation between individuals insofar as they belong to a group, or
a relation between groups, or
a relation between an individual and a group

The group could be an ethnic or kinship group, a social institution or organisation, a social class, a nation or gender etc.

A social relation is therefore not simply identical with an interpersonal relation or an individual relation, although all these types of relations presuppose each other. A social relation refers to a common social characteristic of a group of people.

Society for Marx is the sum total of social relations connecting its members.

Social relations of production in Marx's sense refer to

(often legally encoded) ownership and control relations pertaining to society's productive assets,
the way people are formally and informally associated within the economic sphere of production, including as social classes,
co-operative work relations (including household labor),
socio-economic dependencies between people arising from the way they produce and reproduce their existence,
relationships between different worksites or production sites
the quantitative proportions of different aspects of the sphere of production, considered from the point of view of society as a whole.

The totality of social relations of production constitute the social structure of the economy, which according to Marx determine how incomes, products and assets will be distributed.

Social/technical distinction and reification

Combined with the productive forces, the relations of production constitute a historically specific mode of production. Karl Marx contrasts the social relations of production with the technical relations of production; in the former case, it is people (subjects) who are related, in the latter case, the relation is between people and objects in the physical world they inhabit (those objects are, in the context of production, what Marx calls the "means of labor" or means of production).

However, Marx argues that with the rise of market economy, this distinction is increasingly obscured and distorted. In particular, a cash economy makes it possible to define, symbolise and manipulate relationships between things that people make in abstraction from the social and technical relations involved. Marx says this leads to the reification (thingification or Verdinglichung) of economic relations, of which commodity fetishism is a prime example.

The marketplace seems to be a place where all people have free and equal access and freely negotiate and bargain over deals and prices on the basis of civil equality. People will buy and sell goods without really knowing where they originated or who made them. They know that objectively they depend on producers and consumers somewhere else, that this social dependency exists, but they do not know who specifically those people are or what their activities are. Market forces seem to regulate everything, but what is really behind those market forces has become obscured, because the social relationship between people or their relation with nature is expressed as a commercial relationship between things (money, commodities, capital) (see also value-form).

Some social relations of production therefore exist in an objective, mind-independent way, not simply because they are a natural necessity for human groups, but because of the mediation of social and technical relations by commerce. In addition to creating new social and technical relations, commerce introduces a proliferation of relationships between tradeable 'things'. Not only do relationships between 'things' (commodities, prices etc.) begin to indicate and express social and technical relations, the commercial relations also begin to govern and regulate the pattern of human contact and technique.

The fact therefore that particular social relations of production acquire an objective, mind-independent existence may not be due to any natural necessity asserting itself but only to a purely social necessity: commodity exchange objectifies social relations to the point where they escape from conscious human control, and exist such that they can be recognised only by abstract thought.

Relations of distribution

One of the theoretical problems in Marxian economics is to distinguish exactly between relations of production and relations of distribution, determining the significance of each in the allocation of resources. According to the crudest and most vulgar interpretations of Das Kapital, exploitation occurs only at the point of production. Marx himself obviously did not assert this at all, he only postulated the command over the surplus labour of others as the basis of the existence of capital and its economic power.

Marx discusses the theoretical problem in two main places: the introduction to the Grundrisse manuscript and in chapter 51 of Das Kapital. In the Grundrisse, where he defines the total economy to include production, circulation, distribution and consumption (similar to James Mill), he raises the following question:

He answers his own question negatively:

Disagreeing with David Ricardo, who regarded distribution as the proper object of study for economics, Marx argues that the mode of production largely determines the mode of distribution: the source of income and products in production, and their distribution among the population must be analysed within one framework:

In the last chapters of Das Kapital Vol 3, he develops the argument, defining relations of distribution as the "forms" which "express the relationships in which the total value newly produced is distributed among the owners of the various agents of production" (as income and products).

His critique of political economy in this regard was (1) that relations of production or distribution are posited as "natural and eternal" rather than as historically specific relations, (2) that forms of distribution of income and products are crucially determined by property relations pertaining to productive assets; (3) that by constantly reproducing the relations of production, the mode of production of capital also reproduces the relations of distribution corresponding to it.

Late in his life, Marx touches on the issue again:

Criticism of Marx's concept

It is frequently objected by Weberian sociologists (those in the tradition of Max Weber) that Marx paid insufficient attention to the intersubjective dimension of social relations, i.e. the meanings consciously attached by people to their social interactions.

However, Marx's argument is that these subjective or intersubjective meanings permit of infinite variations, and therefore cannot be the foundation for a genuine science of society. Individual meanings depend on shared meanings, and these shared meanings arise out of objective circumstances which exist independently of individuals. So one must begin with understanding those objective interdependencies which by necessity shape and socialise human beings, i.e. those social relations which people as social beings must enter into, regardless of what they may think or wish.

In this context, the young Vladimir Lenin commented:

In fact, Marx devotes a great amount of attention in Das Kapital to explaining why economic relations appear in human consciousness in the way that they do, and why they might appear in a different way than they really are.

Another sort of criticism, from economists, consists of the observation that processes of distribution (of products and income) can to a considerable extent develop independently or  autonomously from what happens in production, with the aid of a developed credit system.

In fact, gross distortions between value added in production, and the distribution of products and incomes, might occur—for example, as a result of underdevelopment, imperialism, state intervention, unequal exchange, fictitious capital, credit bubbles, or capital gains from rising property values.

That is, a society or region might get much more or much less income than the value of what it produces.
In that case, there are intermediary agencies between production and consumption influencing the allocation of resources.

Probably Marx would have acknowledged that, but he would presumably have argued that ultimately, the dyssynchrony or distortion between production and distribution would cause a crisis and then a readjustment of distribution to the real structure of production relations.

See also
Capitalist mode of production
Character mask
Critique of political economy
Law of value
Reserve army of labour
Sociology of space

Notes

References
Vladimir Lenin, What the "Friends of the People" Are and How They Fight the Social-Democrats.
Göran Therborn, Science, Class and Society.
Perry Anderson, In the Tracks of Historical Materialism.
Herbert Gintis, Samuel Bowles, Robert T. Boyd and Ernst Fehr, Moral Sentiments and Material Interests: The Foundations of Cooperation in Economic Life.
John McMurtry, The Structure of Marx's World-View

Marxist theory

ru:Марксистская политическая экономия#Производственные отношения